Andrey Gennadievich Shalopa (born February 19, 1972) – is a Russian film director, producer, screenwriter, actor. He is best known for the film Panfilov's 28 Men.

References

External links

1972 births
Living people
Russian film directors
Saint Petersburg University of Economics and Finance alumni